Celebration Family (1987) is a made for television drama film. It is based on the real story of a married couple, James and Janet Marston, who, after discovering that they are not able to have more children naturally, start to adopt instead. The result was a family of sixteen children, who were often sick, disabled or suffered from behavioural problems.

Starring
James Read as James Marston
Stephanie Zimbalist as Janet Marston
Royce D. Applegate as Shawn
Ed Begley, Jr. as Jake Foreman
Olivia Burnette as Ellie
Anne Haney as Judge Gelson
Vaughn Tyree Jelks as Ricky
Diane Ladd as Mrs. Heflin

Trivia
Olivia Burnette was nominated in 1988 for the Young Artist Awards as the Best Young Actress Under Ten Years of Age in Television or Motion Pictures.

External links

1987 television films
1987 films
1987 drama films
ABC network original films
Films directed by Robert Day
American drama television films
American films based on actual events
1980s English-language films